El Capitan, United States Official Number 285587, was built in 1917 by the Newport News Shipbuilding and Drydock Company at Newport News, Virginia for the Southern Pacific Company Atlantic Steamship Lines. In 1915 the line operated from the North River piers 49–52 at the foot of 11th Street in New York to New Orleans under the flag and name of Morgan Line, which combined with the Southern Pacific's rail service from the Pacific Coast was known as the Sunset Gulf Route. During World War I the ship was purchased from the builder before delivery to the owner by the United States Shipping Board (USSB) which later turned the ship over to the United States Navy which placed her in commission as USS El Capitan (ID-1407) from 1918 to 1919. El Capitan was returned to commercial service by the Southern Pacific Company until just before the United States entry into World War II when the United States War Shipping Administration (WSA) acquired the ship, changed her registry to Panama and placed her in operation under its agent, United States Lines. El Capitan was in the Arctic convoy PQ 17 to the Soviet Union when she came under air attack on 9 July 1942, was damaged and abandoned to be sunk by torpedo just after midnight on 10 July.

Construction and design
Both El Capitan and sister ship El Almirante were designed by the line's engineer, A. S. Hebble, as  single screw ships with three complete steel decks on a transverse framing system. Watertight bulkheads extending to the main deck were fitted at the forepeak, between #1 and #2 holds, aft the engine room and after peak. A watertight bulkhead extending only to the lower deck was fitted aft the ballast tank.

History
The precise launch date is given on widely differing dates in sources. 18 August 1917 is given by Navy. September 21 is given in the Annual Report of the Commissioner of Navigation to the Secretary of Commerce for the fiscal year ending 30 June 1918. The photograph of the ship underway that leads the article "New Southern Pacific Freighters" has an annotation of "8-4-17" indicating the ship was launched, fitted out and underway by 4 August 1917.

World War I
Before delivery to the Southern Pacific Company the ship was requisitioned by an order on 3 August 1917 directly from the builder by the USSB Emergency Fleet Corporation with payment of $230,000. The 19 September 1917 bill of sale specifies that "nothing herein shall be construed to the prejudice of any legal or equitable right or claim" by the "former owner," the Southern Pacific Company. After the United States entered World War I, the United States Shipping Board transferred El Capitan to the U.S. Navy for war service on 21 March 1918. The Navy assigned her the naval registry Identification Number (Id. No.) 1407 and commissioned her the same day as USS El Capitan.

Assigned to the Naval Overseas Transportation Service, El Capitan made four transatlantic voyages between 29 March 1918 and 23 November 1918. She carried various supplies and equipment from United States East Coast ports to Brest, Le Verdon-sur-Mer, and Le Havre in France, and to Plymouth and Devonport in England. On her second voyage, one day out of Philadelphia, Pennsylvania, she sighted a German submarine abeam. Her guns forced the submarine to dive before it could attack.

Interwar years
El Capitan was decommissioned on 1 February 1919 and transferred to the Shipping Board the same day for return to the Southern Pacific Steamship Company for commercial service. On 30 September 1921 Captain J. H. Halsey, the ship's wartime commander now in command in civilian service, hosted a retirement luncheon for the line's Commodore, Edwin F. Parker.

World War II and loss
Before the United States entered World War II, El Capitan was taken over by the United States War Shipping Administration (WSA) and was placed under the operation of United States Lines as WSA's agent on 26 June 1941. She was transferred to Panamanian registry (a flag of convenience) on 1 October 1941 without an official number and change in code letters.

El Capitan was part of Arctic convoy PQ 17, dispersed on Admiralty orders on 4 July 1942, and after picking up 19 survivors of  reached Novaya Zemlya where a small convoy of five other merchant ships and escorts was assembled. That convoy was attacked on 9 July 1942 by Ju 88 aircraft with El Capitan suffering ruptured hull with holds #4 and #5 and the engine room flooding. The hulk was torpedoed by U-251 just after midnight on 10 July.

Footnotes

References

Bibliography

External links
NavSource Online: Section Patrol Craft Photo Archive: El Capitan (ID 1407)

Ships built in Newport News, Virginia
1917 ships
Merchant ships of the United States
World War I cargo ships of the United States
World War II merchant ships of the United States
Shipwrecks in the Arctic Ocean
Cargo ships of the United States Navy
Maritime incidents in July 1942
Ships sunk by German submarines in World War II